Worcester Shrub Hill railway station is one of two railway stations serving the city of Worcester in Worcestershire, England. The other station is Worcester Foregate Street in the city centre. The station is managed by West Midlands Trains, operating here under the West Midlands Railway brand, and it is also served by Great Western Railway.

The other station near the city, Worcestershire Parkway is located just to the south-east of the city.

History

The first station at Shrub Hill was opened in 1850 being jointly owned by the Oxford, Worcester and Wolverhampton and Midland Railways; until 1852 it was used only as a terminus for the latter's services from Birmingham. The present station building was designed by Edward Wilson and built in 1865. It is a Georgian-style building mainly of engineering brick with stone facings. A key feature is the Grade II* waiting room see below. Originally there was also a train shed which was removed in the 1930s. The cast-iron railings on the station staircases remain hidden by boarding. A survival at the station are the Western Region semaphore signals and the almost unique large round main aspect banjo signal located half-way along platform 1. The station is served by Cafe Loco which is situated opposite the booking office, at the main entrance.

Railway operations

The entire station is controlled by Worcester Shrub Hill Signal Box located at the 'London' (south) end of platform 1. The Worcester area is controlled by another two signal boxes at Henwick (west of Foregate Street), and Tunnel Junction to the north of Shrub Hill. Both platform 1 and 2 can be used in either direction, generally trains for Foregate Street use platform one and trains towards Oxford and Cheltenham Spa use platform 2 but this is not in all cases. Platform 3 is a small bay that was used mainly for the former Wessex Trains/Wales & West service towards Cheltenham Spa, as it is a small south facing bay platform its use is limited. Trains leaving Shrub Hill for Foregate Street join a single line that ends near Henwick signal box south of Foregate Street station. This is one of the two single lines through Foregate Street Station.

Near to the station is Worcester traincare depot which is currently operated by West Midlands Trains who also stable trains at various locations around Shrub Hill station. Great Western Railway also stable some of their Diesel Multiple Units (DMU) at Worcester depot. Shrub Hill station is home to West Midlands Trains and Great Western Railway train crew depots. Also to the north of the station behind platform 2 & 3 is a goods yard.

Services

There are also a limited number of trains via  to Birmingham New Street that start or terminate or call here, mainly at peak times or in the early morning/late evening.

Great Western Railway operates about an hourly service to and from London Paddington, the majority of which are via the Cotswold Line and Oxford. GWR run services southwards every two hours to Bristol Temple Meads via Cheltenham and Gloucester, which then mostly continue to either Weymouth or Southampton Central via .

West Midlands Trains's service between Worcester and Gloucester via Ashchurch and Cheltenham to complement the 2-hourly Great Western Railway service was discontinued at the start of the December 2009 railway timetable due to low passenger usage.

Being the bigger of the two stations in Worcester, due to its sidings, Worcester Shrub Hill is often used as stabling point for goods trains and locomotives, as well as an overnight stop for some Great Western Railway rolling stock.

Waiting room
On Platform 2a is the former ladies' waiting room which extends onto the platform. It is a cast-iron frame cast at the Vulcan Iron Works at Worcester. This was a subsidiary of the MacKenzie and Holland signal manufacturing company about 200 yards from Worcester Shrub Hill station. The exterior is decorated with classical pilasters and covered with "majolica" ceramic tiles made by Maw and Company of Broseley.

Maw was originally a Worcester company founded in 1850 when they bought the old Chamberlain tile factory. However, in 1852 they moved to Broseley to be nearer their source of clay. In the main they made encaustic tiles rather than the "majolica" ceramic tiles used to decorate the Shrub Hill waiting room.

Wojtczak writes that in 1873 there was Ladies' Waiting Room Attendant called Mrs Dale who earned 10s and that this was the same rate of pay as a Mrs Spencer who was the office cleaner.

It is Grade II* listed and English Heritage placed it on the "Buildings at Risk Register" in 2003. The official records record that the waiting room was added c1880. In 2005 the register records "The cast iron frame is in need of structural repair. The front wall is leaning out and currently shored up. Preliminary investigative work has been carried out, but repair works were delayed due partly to problem of locating specialist contractors." In April 2005, Network Rail applied for listed building planning consent to restore the waiting room to bring it back into use before the end of 2006. The application gave detail of the work to be carried out including restoration of the cast-iron work and the sourcing and replacement of the missing ceramic tiles. English Heritage included the waiting room on the 2006 "Buildings at Risk Register". Subsequently, restoration work was undertaken and the refurbishment was completed in 2015.

References

Bibliography

Further reading

External links

Rail Around Birmingham and the West Midlands: Worcester Shrub Hill station

Grade II* listed buildings in Worcestershire
Grade II* listed railway stations
Buildings and structures in Worcester, England
Transport in Worcester, England
Railway stations in Worcestershire
DfT Category C1 stations
Former Great Western Railway stations
Former Midland Railway stations
Railway stations in Great Britain opened in 1850
Railway stations served by Great Western Railway
Railway stations served by West Midlands Trains
1850 establishments in England